= Ida Giavarini =

Italian zoologist (1908–1996)

Ida Giavarini (Turin, 16 April 1908 – Bologna, 13 June 1996) was an Italian zoologist, known particularly for the study of small species of great agri-food importance such as chickens, rabbits, bees and fish.

She published more than 200 publications, including several books on poultry farming. From 1953 to 1968, she was the director of the National Institute of Beekeeping and the Poultry Center of Bologna (entities of the Minister of Agriculture); furthermore, from 1956 to 1978 she was the Director of the Institute of Zooculture of the University of Bologna.

She has held roles in the following scientific associations:

- President and Counselor of the Italian Section of the World Association of Scientific Poultry Farming (WPSA)
- Counselor of the Italian Society of Avian Pathology (SIPA)
- Honorary Member of the Italian Society for the Advancement of Zootechnics
- Founding Member of the Scientific Association of Animal Production (ASPA)
- Corresponding Member of the National Academy of Agriculture.

She was also nominated Knight of Merit of the Italian Republic.
